Barrington may refer to:

People
 Barrington (name)
 Barrington baronets, holders of a title in the baronetage of England
 Viscount Barrington, a title in the peerage of Ireland

Places

Australia 
 Barrington, New South Wales
 Barrington, Tasmania
 Barrington River (New South Wales)
 Barrington Tops National Park, New South Wales
 Lower Barrington, Tasmania

Canada 
 Municipality of the District of Barrington, Nova Scotia
 Barrington, Nova Scotia (community)
 Barrington Head, Nova Scotia
 Barrington Passage, Nova Scotia
 Barrington, Quebec
 Barrington Street, Halifax
 CFS Barrington, Nova Scotia, a former Canadian Forces Station

New Zealand 
 Barrington, New Zealand, a suburb in Christchurch

United Kingdom 
 Barrington, Cambridgeshire
 Barrington, Gloucestershire, a civil parish
Great Barrington, Gloucestershire, a village
 Little Barrington, Gloucestershire, a village
 Barrington, Somerset

United States 
 Barrington, Illinois
 Great Barrington, Massachusetts
 Barrington, New Hampshire
 Barrington, New Jersey
 Barrington, New York
 Barrington, Rhode Island

Other countries 
 Barrington Island, English name of Santa Fe Island in the Galápagos Islands

Buildings 
 Barrington Court in Barrington, Somerset, England
 Barrington Hall (Berkeley, California), Berkeley, California, USA
 Barrington Hall, Essex, England, in the village of Hatfield Broad Oak

Other 
 Barrington Atlas of the Greek and Roman World, an atlas of ancient geography
 Barrington Broadcasting, a company operating US TV stations
 Barrington College was a four-year Christian liberal arts college located in Barrington, Rhode Island. It is no longer in operation; its facilities were subsequently sold to Zion Bible College
 Barrington Griffiths Watch Company, a watch maker in Calgary
 Barrington station, a train station in Barrington, Illinois
 Barrington's theorem, a result in computational complexity theory
 Barrington University, former name of the University of Atlanta, a distance-learning school

 The Great Barrington Declaration - a viewpoint about COVID-19 vaccination

See also
 Barrington High School (disambiguation)